We Broke Up is a South Korean web series based on the Naver/Line webtoon of the same name, starring Sandara Park and Kang Seung-yoon (both from YG Entertainment).

Plot
Ji Won-young is an aspiring musician and the lead singer of a band while Noh Woo-ri is a college student. After meeting at one of Won-young's gigs, their relationship blossomed and they soon begin living together. Things become complicated when they decide to part ways but due to various problems with the security deposit and the loan on the apartment, they are forced to remain living together until the contract is up.
Since the two are too rebellious towards each other, they end up formulating few rules for living which included not interfering in each other's life. However, Won-young's sudden suggestion of non interference in each other's love life, concerns Woo-ri and she becomes worried that Won-young already has plans of moving on soon after their break up. The same day Won-young discovers that the band's department no longer belongs to them and decides to work as a part-time in a store, there he happens to meet Yoon Ni-na, who later, on purpose takes Won-young's phone along while he is billing and leaves hers behind that was identical to his. Meanwhile, Woo-ri seems to be worried about Won-young not returning home at night and wonders if he has already started dating. The next day, she thinks a lot about calling him but tries to convince herself not to since they've already broken up. However, she ends up calling him, but when she discovers the phone to have been picked up by a woman, she immediately hangs up.
She then receives a message for an interview and determines to get a job. On the other hand, Ni-na calls up Won-young and asks him to return her phone, who is at first reluctant to do so, but then agrees when offered 300 dollars. He then goes and discovers Ni-na to be a music director who offers him a job for his band The Band I Do Not Know. He asks his band members to arrive at once and they do so. They have a wonderful program that reassures Ni-na about their talent, and she pays them sufficiently.
Woo-ri ends up at a library and meets a former classmate Seo Hyun-woo, while they both pick up the same book for the same interview, they study the whole night but Woo-ri ends up sleeping. Hyun-woo looks at her presentation and modifies it a bit to make it just perfect. The next day the two wake up in library late for the interview and rush to the office without changing. During her presentation, Woo-ri gets nervous on seeing a new presentation but boosts up on the very next slide. Both Hyun-woo and Woo-ri get selected for Gaha Entertainment at different positions.
They get to work on the first day of the job while Won-young signs an agreement to work with Ni-na. The Band I Do Not Know members celebrate at home along with Ni-na and on the other hand, Woo-ri brings along Hyun-woo to celebrate their first day at job and after seeing the band celebrating, those two join them too.
Woo-ri and Won-young envy each other's new partners. With this love hate relation, how will the two reconcile?

Cast
Sandara Park as Noh Woo-ri
Kang Seung-yoon as Ji Won-young
Kang Seung-hyun as Yoon Ni-na
Jang Ki-yong as Seo Hyun-woo
Lee Bum-gyu as Goo Hyun-dong
Kim Kyu-ho as Han Shim-hoon
Lee Se-young as Ji-min

Special Appearances
Choi Ji-woo as herself (episode 3)
Park Sang-hyun as himself (episode 4)
Yoo In-na as herself/DJ (episode 8)
Joo Woo-jae as himself/DJ (episode 8)

Episodes

Production
We Broke Up is a live-action adaption of a popular webtoon bearing the same name. Co-directing the anticipated web-drama is Director Kim Yong-wan, who also co-directed the successful hit "Love Cells" starring former child-actress Kim Yoo-jung, which was recently revived for another season.

The series is jointly planned and produced by YG K-Plus, CJ E&M Digital Studio and Story Plant. On April 22, 2015, the first script reading was held successfully.

The web-drama was released officially under CJ E&M Style Studio, YG Entertainment, and YG K-Plus’ digital platforms all on the same date.

Reception 
The 10 episode web-drama was a smashing success. Amassing views of over 16 million, We Broke Up was the 4th most-viewed web-drama of 2015.
Kang Seung-yoon was nominated and awarded 'Best Actor' for his role as Ji Won-yeong by K-web Fest. Dara was unable to be nominated for her role as she was already nominated for a previous leading role in another web-drama entitled 'Dr. Ian', for which she won 'Best Actress'.

As thanks for the positive reception, the cast of the show held a personal 'mini concert' on August 17.

The success continued when it was invited to be screened at the 21st Geneva International Film Festival, becoming the first of its kind to do so. The series was screened on November 7.

Notes

References

External links
We Broke Up official website 

We Broke Up webtoon at Naver 

South Korean drama web series
Television shows based on South Korean webtoons
2015 web series debuts
2015 web series endings
Naver TV original programming
Television series by Mega Monster